The Bossier Press-Tribune is a newspaper specializing in local news in Bossier Parish in northwestern Louisiana, with some regional, state, and national stories too as they impact the readership. The Press-Tribune is published on Tuesday and Fridays afternoons at 4250 Viking Drive in Bossier City, and has a circulation of 12,500 copies.

The origin of The Press-Tribune can be traced to 1940, when as the weekly Bossier Tribune, it was in competition with the Planters Press. In 1945, T. L. Morris sold the Bossier Tribune to Larry Freeman, who was also the publisher of a Jewish newspaper in Shreveport. In the latter 1970s, the Bossier Tribune and The Planters Press merged to become the Bossier Press-Tribune.

In the 1990s, Robert E. "Bob" Barton, the owner of The Press-Tribune at the time who also served in the Louisiana House of Representatives from 1996 to 2000, purchased from Wilton Corley the Bossier Banner-Progress, a 131-year-old weekly newspaper that serves  Benton, the Bossier parish seat.

The publisher is David Arthur Specht, Jr. (born 1969) of Specht Newspapers, Inc. The Press-Tribune began daily publication in 2008 but since was reduced to three times per week. The sports editor is Russell Wayne Hedges, son of football coach Lee Hedges of Shreveport.

The Press-Tribune is a sister publication of the Minden Press-Herald in Minden in neighboring Webster Parish, Louisiana.

References

External links
Bossier Press-Tribune website

Newspapers published in Louisiana
Newspapers established in 1940
Bossier Parish, Louisiana
1940 establishments in Louisiana